Quercus intricata, common name dwarf oak, intricate oak or Coahuila scrub oak, is a plant species native to northern Mexico and western Texas.

Description
Quercus intricata is an evergreen shrub that reproduces vegetatively, producing large colonies.

The upper side of the leaf is green with scattered clumps of small curly hairs; the underside appears white or brown because of a thick coat of curly hairs.

Distribution
It is common in mountains of the Chihuahuan Desert, in the states of Coahuila, Nuevo León, Durango, and Zacatecas.

The species prefers open chaparral and woodlands, often on slopes.

References

External links
 photo of herbarium specimen collected in Nuevo León in 1996

intricata
Oaks of Mexico
Flora of Texas
Plants described in 1864
Big Bend National Park
Flora of the Chihuahuan Desert
Taxa named by William Trelease